The Eilan is a shinty stadium in the town of Newtonmore, Scotland.  It is the home of Newtonmore Camanachd and has been a shinty venue since at least 1877.

Location

The park is situated near a confluence between the River Calder and the River Spey on the outskirts of Newtonmore. It takes its name from Eilean Bheannchair which sits in the confluence.

History

Shinty is recorded as being first played at the Eilan in 1877.

The ground was redeveloped in 1993  and has hosted several junior finals, including the 2010 Sutherland Cup final.  The club has still to be granted the Camanachd Cup Final.

References

External links
Giants of Shinty
The Eilan being renovated

Sports venues in Highland (council area)
Shinty venues
Sports venues completed in 1877
1877 establishments in Scotland